Jesjua Andrea Angoy i Cruijff (born 11 March 1993), known as Jesjua Angoy-Cruyff, is a Spanish-Dutch footballer who last played for Suburense in Segona Catalana. He is the grandson of former Dutch international and coach Johan Cruyff.

Personal life
Angoy-Cruyff is the grandson of Johan Cruyff, former coach and player for both FC Barcelona and Ajax. He is the son of Chantal Cruyff, Johan's daughter, and Jesús Angoy, a former goalkeeper for FC Barcelona. His uncle is Jordi Cruyff, former Barcelona, Manchester United, and Netherlands national football team player who is currently Sporting Advisor at Barça. Angoy-Cruyff was born in Barcelona while his father played for the club.

Career

Youth
Between 2008 and 2011, Angoy-Cruyff played for the FC Barcelona’s Juvenil B youth academy. After failing to be promoted to the A-team, the player and the club mutually agreed to part ways after two years. After leaving Barcelona, he signed for Wigan Athletic, playing for their reserve team from 2011 to 2013. Prior to his signing at Wigan, Angoy-Cruyff was touted as one of the former Barca youth players who were expected to excel in the Premier League in the future. After joining Wigan, then-coach Roberto Martinez said of the player, "He is only a boy...it is going to be two or three years before he has adapted to the physical side of the game...but he has great ability. Tactically, the boy is a joy to watch" while adding in jest, "I don't know where he gets it from."

After Wigan were relegated from the Premier League following the 2012–13 Premier League season, Angoy-Cruyff left the club and signed a one-year contract with the reserve team of FC Lausanne-Sport of the Swiss Super League, despite an offer to stay with Wigan as they competed in The Championship.  In May 2013, before joining Lausanne in July, the player was taken on trial by D.C. United of Major League Soccer but was ultimately not signed.  In January 2014, Angoy-Cruyff went on an unsuccessful trial with FK AS Trenčín of the Corgoň Liga, the top football league in Slovakia after leaving Lausanne.

Professional
On 16 April 2014, it was announced that Angoy-Cruyff signed for the Dayton Dutch Lions of the USL Pro, the third division of the United States soccer pyramid, on a 3-year contract. He made his debut for the club on 19 April 2014 against the Harrisburg City Islanders, coming on as a 70th-minute substitute for Eli Garner.

He returned to Spain in summer 2015 to join Reus, who sent him on loan to satellite club Morell.

Following his departure from Reus, he played the 2017–18 season in Sitges with Suburense in Segona Catalana.

References

1993 births
Living people
Footballers from Barcelona
Dutch people of Spanish descent

Spanish people of Dutch descent
Spanish footballers
Dutch footballers
Association football midfielders
Spanish expatriate footballers
Expatriate soccer players in the United States
Wigan Athletic F.C. players
FC Lausanne-Sport players
Dayton Dutch Lions players
USL Championship players
Johan Cruyff